Parliamentary elections were held in Colombia in February 1943 to elect the Chamber of Representatives. The Liberal Party received the most votes.

Results

Chamber of Representatives

Senate

References

Parliamentary elections in Colombia
Cololmbia
1943 in Colombia
Election and referendum articles with incomplete results